Stormsrivier is a settlement in Sarah Baartman District Municipality in the Eastern Cape province of South Africa.

The village lies just off the N2 road. The majority of the residents live in RDP housing on the outskirts of the village.

References

External links

Populated places in the Kou-Kamma Local Municipality